Astronotus is a genus of South American fish from the family Cichlidae. There are two commonly recognized species in the genus (listed below), though genetic evidence suggests that additional species exist; several of these possibly distinct populations also have very different juvenile coloration from the two recognized species. Both of the commonly recognized species are found in the Amazon Basin, while one of two also is found in the Paraná and Paraguay rivers. Astronotus species grow to 35 cm in size, and are monomorphic. They are opportunistic omnivores and consume a range of smaller fish, fruits, nuts,  crustaceans, mollusks and other invertebrates in the wild.

One species, the oscar (Astronotus ocellatus), is popular in the aquarium trade. A. ocellatus forms monogamous pairs which spawn in the open, typically on a flattened stone or in a shallow depression. The juvenile colouration is different from that of the adult and may aid in camouflage of the fry.

In contrast, Astronotus crassipinnis is seldom exported for the aquarium trade.

In some classifications the Astronotus is the sole genus in the monogeneric tribe Astronoti of the subfamily Cichlinae.

Species
There are currently two recognized species in this genus:

References

Further reading
 Colatreli, Meliciano, Toffoli, Farias, and Hrbek (2012). Deep phylogenetic divergence and lack of taxonomic concordance in species of Astronotus (Cichlidae). International Journal of Evolutionary Biology 2012. doi:10.1155/2012/915265

 
Astronotini
Cichlid genera
Taxa named by William John Swainson